In enzymology, a shikimate O-hydroxycinnamoyltransferase is an enzyme that catalyzes the chemical reaction

4-coumaroyl-CoA + shikimate  CoA + 4-coumaroylshikimate

Thus, the two substrates of this enzyme are 4-coumaroyl-CoA and shikimate, whereas its two products are CoA and 4-coumaroylshikimate.

This enzyme belongs to the family of transferases, specifically those acyltransferases transferring groups other than aminoacyl groups.  The systematic name of this enzyme class is 4-coumaroyl-CoA:shikimate O-(hydroxycinnamoyl)transferase. This enzyme is also called shikimate hydroxycinnamoyltransferase.  This enzyme participates in phenylpropanoid biosynthesis.

References 

 
 

EC 2.3.1
Enzymes of unknown structure
Hydroxycinnamic acids metabolism